Dmitri Nusinow is an American chronobiologist who studies plant circadian rhythms. He was born on November 7, 1976 in Inglewood, California. He currently resides in St. Louis, and his research focus includes a combination of molecular, biochemical, genetic, genomic, and proteomic tools to discover the molecular connections between signaling networks, circadian oscillators, and specific outputs. By combining these methods, he hopes to apply the knowledge elucidated from the Arabidopsis model to other plant species.

Education and career 

Nusinow received his bachelor's degree in Microbiology and Molecular Genetics at University of California Los Angeles (UCLA) in 1998. During his undergraduate years, Nusinow worked in Jay Gralla's lab and studied in vitro analysis of RNA Pol II transcription in the fission yeast, S.pombe. He continued his education to earn his PhD in Biochemistry and Molecular Biology at University of California San Francisco (UCSF) from 1999 to 2006. During his first four years of graduate school, Nusinow attempted to create a quadruple knock-in (KI) mouse that would purify the protein RNA complex of X-inactive specific transcript (Xist), which plays a key role in dosage compensation in female mammals. The method was unsuccessful, so Nusinow shifted his focus on the mammalian histone variant macroH2A. He discovered that the inhibition of PARP1 by macro-H2A1 contributed to X chromosome inactivation. While in graduate school, he attended a seminar by Roger Hangarter who showed circadian regulated movements in sunflowers. This seminar inspired Nusinow to switch and study circadian rhythms in plants. In 2007, he became a researcher at the Scripps Institute with Steve Kay, and continued with the lab when it moved to University of California San Diego (UCSD) for five additional years. While in Kay's lab, he was influenced by fellow researcher Takato Imaizumi to study ELF3 in plants. Nusinow then became a principal investigator at the Donald Danforth Plant Science Center and an adjunct professor at Washington University in St. Louis in 2012. He now studies to understand how the circadian clock is integrated with environmental signals to control growth, development, and physiology in order to improve the productivity in plants.

Scientific contributions to circadian rhythms in Arabidopsis

Photosensitivity of FKF1/GI complex 
In 2007, Sawa, Nusinow, Kay, and Imaizumi identified how Arabidopsis proteins FKF1 (Flavin-binding, Kelch repeat, F-box 1) and GI (Gigantea) helped regulate flowering photoperiods in Arabidopsis. Their interest in these proteins arose when they saw FKF1 and GI had displayed similar peak times of expression during the long days. Subsequently, they isolated Arabidopsis proteins FKF1 and GI in a test tube and showed that blue light induced in vitro formation of FKF1 and GI complex. The blue light was absorbed by the LOV (Light, Oxygen, or Voltage) domain on the FKF1 protein, and the N terminus of the GI protein was sufficient to interact with FKF1. To test whether the proteins interacted in vivo, they did a series of transgenic experiments on Arabidopsis. A two-hybrid screening method with HA (haemagglutinin)-tagged FKF1 and tandem affinity purification (TAP)-tagged GI system was used to show that GI and FKF1 formed a complex in vivo. Additionally, they saw that this complex positively regulated daytime transcription of constans (CO), a gene promoting flowering in plants. Their results led to a model of how FKF1 and GI complex regulated flowering in response to photoperiods in Arabidopsis.

Hypocotyl growth linked to ELF4/ELF4/LUX complex 
Nusinow continued working with Arabidopsis and in 2011 as part of a team, he published a paper in the journal Nature where he identified proteins Early Flowering 4 (ELF4), Early Flowering 3 (ELF3), and gene lux arrhythmo (LUX) form a multi-protein clock complex that directly regulated growth in Arabidopsis.  Proteins ELF3 and ELF4 contain basic helix-loop-helix (bHLH) structural motif that binds the proteins to DNA. Nusinow named the ELF4, ELF3, and LUX complex “evening complex (EC)” after identifying the complex peaked at dusk. Through a series of transgenic experiments, he showed that ELF4, ELF3, and LUX were required for proper expression of Phytochrome interacting Factor 4 (PIF4) and phytochrome interacting factor 5 (PIF5), two transcription factors critical for regulating hypocotyl  growth Arabidopsis seedlings.

Discovery of PCH1 
In 2015 through 2016, Nusinow and his colleagues identified a protein that was repeatedly associated with the evening complex in AP-MS analysis of the plant circadian clock. Nusinow found that the protein, which he named PCH1 (Photoperiodic Control of Hypocotyl), was an important regulator for the growth of the hypocotyl (the stem of a seedling) during germination. PCH1 reduces hypocotyl growth during long nights by preferentially binding and stabilizing the active form of phytochrome B (phyB), prolonging its activity. PhyB in turn forms photobodies in the nucleus, where it interacts with molecules of the evening complex (EC) to cause downstream inhibition of hypocotyl growth.

The discovery and characterization of PCH1 is especially notable because phyB is normally active only during the day. By stabilizing phyB and maintaining its signaling well into the night, PCH1 allows plant cells to “remember” past illumination and adjust growth programs accordingly.

Selected publications 
 FKF1 and GIGANTEA Complex Formation is Required for Day-Length Measurement in Arabidopsis (2007)
 ELF4-ELF3-LUX Complex Links the Circadian Clock to Diurnal Control of Hypocotyl Growth (2011)
 PCH1 Integrates Circadian and Light-Signaling Pathways to Control Photoperiod-Responsive Growth in Arabidopsis (2016)

Personal life 
Nusinow currently resides in St. Louis with his wife and two children.

See also 
 Circadian rhythm
 Plant biology
 Pseudo-response regulator (PRR)
 TOC1 (gene)

References 

Living people
Chronobiologists
1976 births
University of California, Los Angeles alumni